Baxter is an unincorporated community in  Harlan County, Kentucky, United States.

The community sits at the confluence of Martin's Fork with Clover Fork to form the Cumberland River.

References

Further reading
James S. Greene III.  Major Silas Harlan: His Life and Times Baxter, Kentucky: 1963 

Unincorporated communities in Harlan County, Kentucky
Unincorporated communities in Kentucky